Coreopsis pubescens, called star tickseed, is a North American species of tickseeds in the family Asteraceae. It is native to the central and southeastern United States from eastern Kansas and eastern Texas east as far as Virginia, Florida, and the Carolinas. There are also reports of isolated populations in New England and in northern Indiana, probably as escapes from cultivation.

Coreopsis pubescens is a perennial which sometimes grows as much as 90 cm (3 feet) tall. Flower heads are yellow, with both ray florets and disc florets. It is found in a variety of habitats such as granite outcrops, pine-oak woods, and roadsides.

References

pubescens
Plants described in 1823
Flora of the United States